The eighth edition of the Johan Cruyff Shield was held on 10 August 2003 between 2002–03 Eredivisie champions PSV Eindhoven and 2002–03 KNVB Cup winners FC Utrecht. PSV won the match 3–1.

Match details

References

2003
Johan Cruijff-schaal
j
j
Johan Cruyff Shield